John Edward Mellish (12 January 1886 – 13 July 1970, Medford, Oregon) was an American amateur astronomer and telescope builder.

Biography
Mellish was born in Wisconsin, the son of Arthur Mellish (1862–1928) and Judith Sedora Stimson Mellish (1864–1954). Mellish lived outside of Madison, Wisconsin in Cottage Grove. By age 24 he was credited with discovering or co-discovering two comets: comet Grigg-Mellish (1907b, 1907 II, C/1907 G1) and comet 1907e (1907 V, C/1907 T1) using home built telescopes, and received astronomical medals from both the United States and Mexico as a result. He later discovered another three comets: 1915a (1915 II, C/1915 C1), 1915d (1915 IV, C/1915 R1), and 1917a (1917 I, C/1917 F1, C/Mellish 1).

In November 1915 he announced to have observed craters on Mars, and being the second person to do so after E. E. Barnard. Both claims are disputed to this day, but he is still credited to be the first human to recognize craters on Mars using the great 40-inch Yerkes refractor.

A crater on Mars (Mellish) was named in his honor.

In 1931, Mellish confessed to committing incest with his 15-year-old daughter. Astronomers advocated that he be spared jail time because of his value to science, and it was proposed that he be sterilized. Mellish was released on bail in April 1933 after the case never came to trial, and he moved to California. His wife divorced him in May 1933 and was given custody of their eight children.

See also 
 Sherzer Observatory

References

External links
Discussion of crater observations on Mars
 Wisconsin Academy review The boy astronomer of Cottage Grove

1886 births
1970 deaths
American astronomers
Discoverers of comets
People from Cottage Grove, Wisconsin